The Archipelago Brewery is a Singaporean brewery owned by Heineken Asia Pacific (formerly Asia Pacific Breweries). It labels itself as "Singapore's Craft Brewery".

History 
In August 1931, with a capital of 5,250,000 guilders N.V. Archipel Brouwerij Compagnie (Archipelago Brewery Co.) was formed in Batavia (now known as Jakarta). The board was formed by the firm Geo Wehry & co. This company imported all by Beck brewery in Bremen to brew Koentji (key) beer. The first brewery was built in Batavia, it was made of steel framing, something in the Dutch Indies virtually not been done before. Wehry was a big trading company, started out in the tobacco. Wehry was later merged with Borsumij and then merged into the still existing Hagemeyer that time in the Dutch East Indies was established.

Archipelago opened a brewery in Singapore in November 1933, where it produced Anchor Beer.

During World War II, the British deemed the brewery to be enemy territory due to its German ties and seized it in 1941. It was then bought by Malayan Breweries Ltd, which in 1990 was renamed Asia Pacific Breweries. In 2013, Asia Pacific Breweries merged to become Heineken Asia Pacific.

Archipelago Brewery is currently Heineken Asia Pacific's craft brewing arm. The old Archipelago Brewery was re-commissioned on 24 July 2006, with internationally acclaimed brewmasters, Fal Allen and Malcom Lewis. Three variants of the Archipelago craft beers, namely Traveller's Wheat, Straits Pale and Traders Brown Ale were launched at Archipelago's flagship pub located on Circular Road in Singapore (now closed).

The re-launch of Archipelago is consistent with Heineken Asia Pacific's objectives to add a new dimension to Singapore's beer industry; and to continue to grow its presence and stature locally.

Archipelago Brewery produces boutique beers in small batches. In 2016, Archipelago Brewery brewed and sold 390,000 litres of beer. The Archipelago Brewery currently produces six permanent beers: Tropical Pale Ale, Singapore Blonde Ale, Belgian Wit, Summer IPA, Bohemian Lager and Irish Ale, in addition to limited edition or specialty beers.

Specialty Brews
Occasionally, the brewery creates speciality brews which are typically sold as limited-release products, produced in much smaller quantities than the regular brews. Previous speciality brews include:

 Anderson Valley Brewing collaboration Pale Ale – Fresh seedless red Californian grapes were squeezed and added to boil in the last 5 minutes, along with Nelson Sauvin and Pacifica hops to give it a subtle orange and gooseberry hop aroma. After a week of cold conditioning, the beer was flushed into a separate tank containing dry hopping bags full of freshly cut and sterilised passion fruit. ABV 4.6%, Bitterness 32 IBU, Colour 25EBC
 1925 Archi Mango IPA collaboration – Various hops were used in the boil and whirlpool to give it flavours of grapefruit, orange and passion fruit. Fresh Mango was added on the 4-day of fermentation along with generous amounts of Centennial hops to give it herbal lemon citrus aromas. ABV – 5.55% Bitterness – 45 IBU.
 Renku Lager – Dry hopped with Challenger (UK) and a dash of Japanese green tea which provides a clean fresh aroma of evergreen, wood and green tea tones.  
 HOPSALE – American Pale Ale with 8 types of hops added throughout different stages of the brew. 5% ABV
 COCO's Cream – Nitrogen saturated smooth pour cream ale made with a large amount of cooking chocolate. 4.2% ABV
 TALL TALE Pale Ale – Mixed with lemon grass

Awards

External links
Archipelago Brewery Website

References 

Food and drink companies established in 1931
Beer in Singapore
Heineken subsidiaries
1931 establishments in Singapore
Singaporean brands